The A.Q. Miller School of Journalism and Mass Communications offers distinguished programs of instruction and research leading to the bachelor's and master's degrees in mass communications at Kansas State University. Undergraduates can pursue a science or arts degree in one of two sequences: Journalism and Digital Media and Strategic Communications. Emphases include drone journalism, news broadcasting, graphics production, public relations, and advertising. The Miller School teaches drone photography and video in partnership with the K-State Polytechnic Unmanned Aircraft Systems Flight and Operations program. The School collaborates in the Kansas State interdisciplinary doctoral degree program in leadership communication with departments of Communication Studies, Leadership Studies, Communications and Agricultural Education, and the Institute of Civic Discourse and Democracy.

Nationally accredited by the Accrediting Council on Education in Journalism and Mass Communications, the School has more than 6,000 living alumni, nearly 500 undergraduate majors, 100 minors, 25 graduate students, and 30 members of faculty and staff. Its operating budget 2018-19 is more than $2 million, with 57 students receiving School scholarships totaling $152,000.

The School houses the headquarters of the Journalism Education Association (JEA), the largest national organization of scholastic journalism. It houses three endowed chairs or centers: the Huck Boyd National Center for Community Media, R.M. Seaton Chair in Professional Journalism, and Ross Beach Chair in Mass Communications.

History 
Kansas State University offered printing classes in 1874 using a sheet-fed press in the basement of Kedzie Hall, the stately limestone building that houses the storied School, making it the first American university to offer a program in newspaper printing.

In 1910, Kansas State became the second university in the United States to offer a journalism program (after the University of Missouri, 1908) upon the hiring of Charles J. Dillon, a journalist of The Kansas City Star who set up its journalism curriculum. Dillon's curriculum, titled "industrial journalism," required students to take courses in home economics, agriculture, and engineering, in addition to reporting and copy editing. As scopes of the curriculum and its disciplines expanded, "mass communications" was added to the School name in 1971. In autumn 2018, School director Nikhil Moro, the digital media scholar, led the launch of a six-year strategic plan to emphasize research and instruction in media and audience analytics, audio and video streaming, virtual and augmented reality, and social media applications in journalism, public relations, and advertising.

The School is named for distinguished Kansas publisher and editor Alexander Quintella Miller, Sr. (b., February 7, 1874; d., December 29, 1959), whose son, Carl Miller, a Kansas State alumnus, made a financial gift in 1987.

For more than 50 years, A.Q. Miller published The Belleville Telescope, a weekly newspaper established 1870 in Belleville, Kansas, the seat of Republic County. He took his first job as a newspaperman at age 17 as a printer's devil with the Clifton News, a daily newspaper published 1889–1923 in Washington and Clay counties of northern Kansas. About his first job, he was quoted to state: "When I first went to work for the Clifton News, I hadn't the vaguest idea what a printer's devil did. I soon found out. My first assigned task was to mail the single wrappers, individual copies of the newspaper. Flour paste was mixed and used to seal the wrappers. I can still vividly recall the odor exuding from the unused paste after the job was completing. The shop took on all the fragrance of a [meat-]packing plant." A.Q. Miller went to accomplish what the Kansas Editorial Association later recognized as "Distinguished Service in the Field of Journalism" that included several appointments outside of newspapers, such as national counselor to the United States Chamber of Commerce, chief clerk of the United States Senate, and division chief of the U.S. Bureau of Internal Revenue. He advocated strongly for the interstate freeway system, which, consequently, was launched in the state of Kansas.

A.Q. Miller School Student Media

Update alumni magazine  
The School publishes a bi-annual alumni magazine, Update, that highlights notable alumni achievements, positive stories, important changes in curriculum and the School's role in the quickly evolving communication and media industries. The magazine is printed at Publication Printers in Denver, Colorado, with a distribution run of nearly 5000.

KSDB Wildcat 91.9 
KSDB91.9 is Kansas State University's campus radio station. A non-commercial radio station located in Manhattan, Kansas, broadcasting on 91.9 MHz on the FM dial, KSDB is staffed by about 100 student volunteers who gain valuable experience in all areas of radio broadcasting.  It plays alternative/independent rock, hip hop, and jazz. KSDB-FM, which has been on the air since 1949, is the oldest, continuously operating FM station in the state of Kansas.

KKSU-HD TV 
K-State's student-run television station includes two weekly shows: Channel 8 News and MHK All day. Students of any major can be involved with broadcasts beginning their first week on campus. The station is an officially, FCC-licensed low-powered television station serving Manhattan and Riley County, Kansas. The station is available over-the-air on channel 24 or through the Cox Cable system in Manhattan and surrounding areas on cable channel 8.

The Collegian 
The Kansas State Collegian is the official daily student-run newspaper of Kansas State University. Founded in 1896, the Collegian has a circulation of 4,750. It is owned and published by Collegian Media Group.

Manhappenin' Magazine 
Manhappenin' Magazine is Kansas State University's student-created lifestyle magazine. In 2018, the magazine (which is in its third year of production), won third place in the ACP/CMA National College Media Convention's Pinnacle Award's four-year feature magazine of the year category. The magazine has a print edition, web content at their web site, manappeninmagazine.com, and an active Instagram.

Royal Purple Yearbook 
The Royal Purple's mission is to encapsulate student, faculty and staff memories and history at Kansas State University each year. The 2017 Royal Purple won the Pacemaker award, which is the ACP/CMA National College Media Convention's award for best yearbook in the country.

Centennial celebration 

After 100 years of operation, faculty, staff, students, and alumni of the school celebrated its centennial from Sept. 2-4 2010. Events included the 11th annual Huck Boyd Lecture in Community Media, which was presented by broadcast journalist and K-State alumna Gail Pennybacker, an A.Q. Miller School memorabilia room at the Kansas State University Student Union, a panel on photojournalism, a banquet, and more.

Throughout the celebration, the school raised money for the Dave MacFarland Tools for Tomorrow Technology Fund, which was created to provide media technology for journalism students.

Notable alumni 

Daniel Biles, '74, justice at the Kansas Supreme Court
Craig Bolerjack, '81, voice of the Utah Jazz 
Scott Kraft, '77, managing editor of the Los Angeles Times
Steve Physioc, voice of the Kansas City Royals
Pete Souza, Chief White House Photographer

References 

Kansas State University colleges and schools
Journalism schools in the United States
Educational institutions established in 1910
1910 establishments in Kansas